Diego Pinzón (born 12 February 1985) is a Colombian racewalking athlete. He represented Colombia at the 2020 Summer Olympics in Tokyo 2021, placing 18th in the men's 50 kilometres walk.

References

External links
 

 

1985 births
Living people
Colombian male racewalkers
Athletes (track and field) at the 2020 Summer Olympics
Olympic athletes of Colombia
Sportspeople from Antioquia Department
Pan American Games medalists in athletics (track and field)
Pan American Games bronze medalists for Colombia
Medalists at the 2019 Pan American Games